The 1906 Washington State football team was an American football team that represented Washington State College during the 1906 college football season. The team competed as an independent under first-year head coach John R. Bender and compiled a record of 6–0.

Schedule

References

Washington State
Washington State Cougars football seasons
College football undefeated seasons
Washington State football